The 2019 Radio Disney Music Awards (rebranded as ARDYs: A Radio Disney Music Celebration) were held on June 16, 2019, in Los Angeles, California at the CBS Studio Center. It was broadcast on Disney Channel, DisneyNow and VTV3 at 8:00 p.m. (EDT). The event was hosted by actress and singer Sofia Carson. It was the final edition of the award before Radio Disney ceased operations in 2021. Due to the COVID-19 pandemic, no awards ceremony was held in 2020 and the event was renamed Radio Disney Presents ARDYs Summer Playlist for that year.

Performances

Awards
Unlike previous years, there was no competitive categories for this year's show. However they were some special awards.
 Global Phenom Award: BTS
 Hero Award: Avril Lavigne

References

External links

Radio Disney Music Awards
Radio Disney
Radio Disney
Radio Disney
Radio Disney
Radio Disney Music Awards